is the tenth single by Japanese band Princess Princess. Written by Kanako Nakayama and Kaori Okui, the single was released by Sony Records on November 21, 1990. It became their fourth of five consecutive No. 1 singles on Oricon's singles chart.

Background 
"Julian" was Princess Princess' first ballad single. While the title is a reference to the band's former name , lead guitarist Kanako Nakayama named the song after her pet cat, which was given to her by Bow Wow lead vocalist Kyoji Yamamoto. Julian had lived with the band at their training camp in Nishi-Nippori, but shortly after the band left the training camp, he ran away and was never seen again. Despite the title, the song is not about Nakayama's cat, but a former lover of hers.

The song's original key is C.

The song was used by Citizen for their Lighthouse watch commercials. The B-side, "Rock Me", was used by Sony for their cassette tape commercials.

Chart performance 
"Julian" hit No. 1 on Oricon's singles chart and No. 13 on Oricon's year-ending chart in 1991. It also sold over 588,000 copies and was certified Platinum by the RIAJ.

Track listing 
All music is composed by Kaori Okui and arranged by Princess Princess.

Chart positions 
Weekly charts

Year-end charts

Certifications

Cover versions 
 Honey Sac covered the song in their 2004 album 19 Growing Up.
 Viola covered the song in their 2008 album Le Table.
 Munehiro covered the song in her 2013 album Ankora feat. Kenty Gross.
 Yo Hitoto covered the song in her 2015 album Hitoto Uta.

References

External links 
 
 

1990 singles
1990 songs
Princess Princess (band) songs
Japanese-language songs
Oricon Weekly number-one singles
Sony Music Entertainment Japan singles